The Verkhnekingashskoye mine is a large mine in the north of Russia near Norilsk in the Krasnoyarsk Krai. Verkhnekingashskoye represents one of the largest nickel reserve in Russia having estimated reserves of 484.6 million tonnes of ore grading 0.44% nickel. The 484.6 million tonnes of ore contains 2.16 million tonnes of nickel metal.

See also 
 List of mines in Russia

References 

Nickel mines in Russia